Haritalodes adjunctalis is a moth in the family Crambidae. It was described by Patrice J.A. Leraut in 2005. It is found in Papua New Guinea and in Fiji.

References

Moths described in 2005
Spilomelinae